The Convention on the Political Rights of Women was approved by the United Nations General Assembly during the 409th plenary meeting, on 20 December 1952, and adopted on 31 March 1953.

The Convention's purpose is to codify a basic international standard for women's political rights.

Background
In the aftermath of World War II, many countries had still not granted women full political liberty. In 1952, the year before the Convention was adopted, women's suffrage had been granted in less than 100 countries worldwide.

The main impetus for the legislation, and much of its drafting, came from the United Nations Commission on the Status of Women. The Commission sent a survey about women's political rights to its member states; the resulting replies became the basis for the Convention.

The Convention was adopted on 31 March 1953.

Overview

Preamble
The preamble of the Convention reiterates the principles set out in article 21 of the Universal Declaration of Human Rights, which declares that all people have the right to participate in the government of their country, and to access public services. The Convention on the Political Rights of Women specifically protects this right for women.

Articles
The first three articles of the Convention assert the rights of women to vote (Article I), to be eligible for election (II), and to hold public office (III), with each article ending with the specification: "all on equal terms with men, without any discrimination." The remaining articles cover the mechanics of the legislation itself, specifying how and when it will come into force (Articles IV–XI).

Legacy
The Convention entered into force on 7 July 1954. As of August 2015, it has 123 state parties, comprising 122 United Nations member states plus the State of Palestine.

The Convention followed the path of the Inter American Convention on the Granting Political Rights to Women that was the first international legislation at the regional level protecting the equal status of women to exercise political rights. The Convention was the first treaty in the context of the United Nation Moreover, it was the second international treaty to obligate its states to protect citizens' political rights. The Convention was one of the United Nations' several efforts in the postwar period to set standards of nondiscrimination against women; others were the Convention on the Nationality of Married Women and the Convention on Consent to Marriage, Minimum Age for Marriage and Registration of Marriages, brought into force in 1958 and 1964, respectively.

The rights outlined by the Convention were incorporated into the later, more substantial Convention on the Elimination of All Forms of Discrimination Against Women. This later Convention, a wider-reaching and more straightforward legislation for nondiscrimination, was approved by unanimous vote in 1967.

See also
Citizenship
Convention on the Elimination of All Forms of Discrimination Against Women

References

External links
Full text of the Convention on the Political Rights of Women
Signatures and ratifications

Women's rights instruments
Women's suffrage
Treaties entered into force in 1954
Treaties concluded in 1953
Treaties adopted by United Nations General Assembly resolutions
United Nations treaties
Treaties of the Kingdom of Afghanistan
Treaties of the People's Socialist Republic of Albania
Treaties of Algeria
Treaties of the People's Republic of Angola
Treaties of Antigua and Barbuda
Treaties of Argentina
Treaties of Armenia
Treaties of Australia
Treaties of Austria
Treaties of the Bahamas
Treaties of Bangladesh
Treaties of Barbados
Treaties of the Byelorussian Soviet Socialist Republic
Treaties of Belgium
Treaties of Bolivia
Treaties of Bosnia and Herzegovina
Treaties of the Second Brazilian Republic
Treaties of the People's Republic of Bulgaria
Treaties of Burkina Faso
Treaties of Burundi
Treaties of Canada
Treaties of the Central African Republic
Treaties of Chile
Treaties of Colombia
Treaties of the Republic of the Congo
Treaties of Costa Rica
Treaties of Ivory Coast
Treaties of Croatia
Treaties of Cuba
Treaties of Cyprus
Treaties of Czechoslovakia
Treaties of the Czech Republic
Treaties of Zaire
Treaties of Denmark
Treaties of the Dominican Republic
Treaties of Ecuador
Treaties of Egypt
Treaties of El Salvador
Treaties of the Ethiopian Empire
Treaties of Fiji
Treaties of Finland
Treaties of the French Fourth Republic
Treaties of Gabon
Treaties of Georgia (country)
Treaties of East Germany
Treaties of West Germany
Treaties of Ghana
Treaties of the Kingdom of Greece
Treaties of Guatemala
Treaties of Guinea
Treaties of the Hungarian People's Republic
Treaties of Haiti
Treaties of Iceland
Treaties of India
Treaties of Indonesia
Treaties of Ireland
Treaties of Israel
Treaties of Italy
Treaties of Jamaica
Treaties of Jordan
Treaties of Kazakhstan
Treaties of Kyrgyzstan
Treaties of the Kingdom of Laos
Treaties of Latvia
Treaties of Lebanon
Treaties of Lesotho
Treaties of the Libyan Arab Jamahiriya
Treaties of Luxembourg
Treaties of Madagascar
Treaties of Malawi
Treaties of Mali
Treaties of Malta
Treaties of Mauritania
Treaties of Mauritius
Treaties of Mexico
Treaties of the Mongolian People's Republic
Treaties of Montenegro
Treaties of Morocco
Treaties of Nepal
Treaties of the Netherlands
Treaties of New Zealand
Treaties of Nicaragua
Treaties of Niger
Treaties of Nigeria
Treaties of Norway
Treaties of the Dominion of Pakistan
Treaties of the State of Palestine
Treaties of Papua New Guinea
Treaties of Paraguay
Treaties of Peru
Treaties of the Philippines
Treaties of the Polish People's Republic
Treaties of South Korea
Treaties of Moldova
Treaties of the Socialist Republic of Romania
Treaties of the Soviet Union
Treaties of Rwanda
Treaties of Senegal
Treaties of Serbia and Montenegro
Treaties of Yugoslavia
Treaties of Sierra Leone
Treaties of Slovakia
Treaties of Slovenia
Treaties of the Solomon Islands
Treaties of Spain
Treaties of Saint Vincent and the Grenadines
Treaties of Eswatini
Treaties of Sweden
Treaties of Tajikistan
Treaties of Thailand
Treaties of North Macedonia
Treaties of Trinidad and Tobago
Treaties of Tunisia
Treaties of Turkey
Treaties of Turkmenistan
Treaties of Uganda
Treaties of the Ukrainian Soviet Socialist Republic
Treaties of the United Kingdom
Treaties of Tanzania
Treaties of the United States
Treaties of Uzbekistan
Treaties of Venezuela
Treaties of South Yemen
Treaties of Zambia
Treaties of Zimbabwe
1953 in New York City
Treaties extended to Akrotiri and Dhekelia
Treaties extended to Saint Christopher-Nevis-Anguilla
Treaties extended to Bermuda
Treaties extended to the British Antarctic Territory
Treaties extended to the British Indian Ocean Territory
Treaties extended to the British Virgin Islands
Treaties extended to the Cayman Islands
Treaties extended to the Falkland Islands
Treaties extended to Gibraltar
Treaties extended to Guernsey
Treaties extended to the Isle of Man
Treaties extended to Jersey
Treaties extended to Montserrat
Treaties extended to the Pitcairn Islands
Treaties extended to Saint Helena, Ascension and Tristan da Cunha
Treaties extended to South Georgia and the South Sandwich Islands
Treaties extended to the Turks and Caicos Islands
Treaties extended to Greenland
Treaties extended to the Faroe Islands
Treaties extended to Surinam (Dutch colony)
Treaties extended to the British Solomon Islands
Treaties extended to Brunei (protectorate)
Treaties extended to Swaziland (protectorate)
Treaties extended to the Kingdom of Tonga (1900–1970)
Treaties extended to British Hong Kong
Treaties extended to British Antigua and Barbuda
Treaties extended to British Dominica
Treaties extended to British Saint Lucia
Treaties extended to British Saint Vincent and the Grenadines
Treaties extended to British Grenada
Treaties extended to British Honduras
Treaties extended to the Colony of the Bahamas
Treaties extended to West Berlin
1953 in women's history